Eczemothea is a genus of beetle in the family Cerambycidae. Its only species is Eczemothea pustulifera. It was described by Schwarzer in 1926.

References

Pteropliini
Beetles described in 1926